The 1974 Giro d'Italia was the 57th edition of the Giro d'Italia, one of cycling's Grand Tours. The Giro began in the Vatican City on 16 May, and Stage 11b occurred on 27 May with a stage to Forte dei Marmi. The race finished in Milan on 8 June.

Stage 1
16 May 1974 — Vatican City to Formia,

Stage 2
17 May 1974 — Formia to Pompei,

Stage 3
18 May 1974 — Pompei to Sorrento,

Rest day
19 May 1970

Stage 4
20 May 1974 — Sorrento to Sapri,

Stage 5
21 May 1974 — Sapri to Taranto,

Stage 6
22 May 1974 — Taranto to Foggia,

Stage 7
23 May 1974 — Foggia to Chieti,

Stage 8
24 May 1974 — Chieti to Macerata,

Stage 9
25 May 1974 — Macerata to Carpegna,

Stage 10
26 May 1974 — Carpegna to Modena,

Stage 11a
27 May 1974 — Modena to Il Ciocco,

Stage 11b
27 May 1974 — Il Ciocco to Forte dei Marmi,

References

1974 Giro d'Italia
Giro d'Italia stages